Coscullano is a hamlet located in the municipality of Loporzano, in Huesca province, Aragon, Spain. As of 2020, it has a population of 34.

Geography 
Coscullano is located 24km east-northeast of Huesca.

References

Populated places in the Province of Huesca